Camp Branch is a stream in Cass and Johnson counties in the U.S. state of Missouri. It is a tributary of Big Creek.

The stream starts five miles north of Harrisonville just north of Missouri Route P. It flows southeast under route P and Missouri Route 7 and passes just north of East Lynne and south of the community of Gunn City. The stream enters Johnson County and reaches its confluence 1.5 miles into Johnson County one mile east of the community of La Tour.

Camp Branch was named for the fact people camped along its course.

See also
List of rivers of Missouri

References

Rivers of Cass County, Missouri
Rivers of Johnson County, Missouri
Rivers of Missouri